The Land Title Building and Annex is a historic early skyscraper located at 1400 Chestnut Street in Philadelphia, Pennsylvania.

It was built for the oldest title insurance company in the world, the Land Title Bank and Trust Company. The two-building complex, joined at the first floor, was built in two phases. The earlier, northern one of the building's two towers, erected in 1898 of 15 stories, was designed by Chicago-based architect Daniel Burnham, who was an early pioneer in the development of tall buildings. The southern, 22-story, 331-ft tower, added in 1902, was also designed by Burnham in collaboration with Philadelphia architect Horace Trumbauer; it was built on the site of the former Lafayette Hotel.

The building was listed on the National Register of Historic Places in 1978.

References

External links

Land Title & Trust Building at emporis.com
Land Title Building at Philadelphia Architects and Buildings
Land Title Bank & Trust Company at the Historic American Buildings Survey
Land Title & Trust Block at SkyScraperPage.com

Commercial buildings on the National Register of Historic Places in Philadelphia
Neoclassical architecture in Pennsylvania
Market East, Philadelphia
1898 establishments in Pennsylvania
Skyscraper office buildings in Philadelphia
Office buildings completed in 1898
Horace Trumbauer buildings